The Sisterhood is an American reality documentary television series on TLC. The series debuted on January 1, 2013.

Premise
The series follows the lives of several preacher's wives as they handle their daily home life as well as managing their churches and businesses.

Cast
 Domonique Scott
 Tara Lewis
 Ivy Couch
 Christina Murray
 DeLana Rutherford

Episodes

References

External links

Sisterhood, The
Sisterhood, The
Sisterhood, The
Sisterhood, The
Sisterhood, The
Sisterhood, The